Casper Robert Van Dien Jr. (born December 18, 1968) is an American actor. He is best known for his lead role as Johnny Rico in the 1997 science-fiction action film Starship Troopers.  He has also appeared in a large number of television and film roles, often in daytime and primetime soap operas, and a large number of TV movies and direct-to-video films, including Starship Troopers 3: Marauder, a 2008 sequel to the original film.

Early life
Van Dien was born and raised in the Pensacola suburb of Milton, Florida, the son of Diane (née Morrow), a nursery school teacher, and Casper Robert Van Dien Sr., a U.S. Navy Commander and fighter pilot.

There is a long military tradition in Van Dien's family. Aside from his father, his grandfather was a Marine during World War II. Van Dien is descended from an old Dutch family long settled in the New York area; his other heritage includes Swedish, French, and English.

The street on which Van Dien grew up in Ridgewood, New Jersey, Van Dien Avenue, was named after his great-great-great-grandfather.  When Van Dien was older, his family moved to Florida, where he enrolled at the St. Petersburg campus of the Admiral Farragut Academy, graduating 3rd in command. After high school, Van Dien attended Florida State University in Tallahassee, where he was a member of Sigma Alpha Epsilon fraternity.

Career
After moving to Los Angeles, Van Dien landed a number of small parts in various television series and movies. Two early breaks were recurring roles as Ty Moody on the daytime soap opera One Life to Live and the prime time drama Beverly Hills, 90210. Keen to expand his acting talents, Van Dien took a bit part in the video game, Wing Commander IV.

In 1996, Van Dien played King Tal in Beastmaster III: The Eye of Braxus, the second sequel to the 1982 cult classic, The Beastmaster. Van Dien also starred in the 1997 James Dean biopic James Dean: Race with Destiny. Soon after, he got the breakthrough role of Johnny Rico in Paul Verhoeven's 1997 science fiction action film Starship Troopers. His success in Starship Troopers subsequently resulted in his casting as Tarzan in Tarzan and the Lost City (1998). Van Dien next played Brom von Brunt in Tim Burton's 1999 film Sleepy Hollow, a reworking of the classic Washington Irving tale.

In 2000 Van Dien appeared in Cutaway as well as Aaron Spelling's short-lived NBC prime time soap Titans with Yasmine Bleeth, John Barrowman, Perry King and Victoria Principal. He filmed several scenes as Patrick Bateman, in 2002's The Rules of Attraction. However, the scenes were unused in the final film.

In 2008 Van Dien returned to the role of Rico in Starship Troopers 3: Marauder, a direct-to-video sequel to Starship Troopers.

Van Dien replaced Matt Mullins as Johnny Cage for the second season of the YouTube webseries Mortal Kombat: Legacy.

In 2020, he joined the cast of the independent film Daughter. In 2022, Van Dien played the role of Samual Hyst in the series Salvage Marines, where he was also credited as a producer, an adaptation of the Necrospace book series; in an interview, he favorably compared this role to that of Johnny Rico.

Personal life

From 1993 to 1997 Van Dien was married to Carrie Mitchum (granddaughter of Robert Mitchum). Van Dien had co-starred with Robert Mitchum in James Dean: Race with Destiny. They have two children, including actress Grace Van Dien (born 1996).

In 1999 Van Dien met actress Catherine Oxenberg during the filming of the TV movie The Collectors, and they soon worked together again in the 1999 thriller The Omega Code. On May 8, 1999, they married at Graceland Wedding Chapel in Las Vegas, Nevada. In 2005, the couple appeared in their own reality series, I Married a Princess, which aired on the Lifetime Television channel in the United States, LIVINGtv in the United Kingdom and Lifestyle You in Australia; Oxenberg's mother is Princess Elizabeth of Yugoslavia. During the 2006–2007 TV season, Van Dien and Oxenberg co-starred in the American drama series Watch Over Me on MyNetworkTV. Oxenberg had a daughter from a previous relationship, India Riven Oxenberg (born 1991). Van Dien and Oxenberg have two daughters, born 2001 and 2003. In 2015, Van Dien filed for divorce from Oxenberg. Oxenberg and Van Dien were celebrity ambassadors for the non-profit organization Childhelp.

Van Dien married Jennifer Wenger in June 2018.

Filmography

Film

Television

Producer

Web

Video games

References

External links

 

1968 births
Admiral Farragut Academy alumni
American male film actors
American male soap opera actors
American male television actors
American producers
American people of Dutch descent
American people of English descent
American people of French descent
American people of Swedish descent
Florida State University alumni
Living people
Participants in American reality television series
People from Ridgewood, New Jersey
People from Milton, Florida
American people of Scandinavian descent
20th-century American male actors
21st-century American male actors